Isa Bakar (25 December 1952 – 28 August 2010) was a football player who represented the Malaysian national football team in the 1970s. He played for Penang FA in Malaysia's domestic competition.

Career overview
Isa first played for Penang FA in 1970. Later, he continued playing in the Penang League, having represented the Penang Port Commission team (PPC FC) in the FAM soccer competition in 1981 and 1983. Isa represented Malaysia national team when they finished third in the 1974 Asian Games in Iran when his scored two goals against the only Asian team that was at the 1966 World Cup, North Korea to won 2-1. In the same year, he was part of the Malaysia Cup-winning Penang side. Besides that, in 1976, he also helped the Penang side to won the  Aga Khan Gold Cup international tournament held in Dhaka. He was a prolific striker and formed a deadly combination with Mokhtar Dahari when both them scored 16 goals for national team in 1976. Overall, Isa had total 69 caps with 45 international goals for Malaysia.

On 11 May 1975, Isa is also part of the Malaysia Selection that played against Arsenal FC in a friendly match which his team won by 2-0 at Merdeka Stadium. Later, He scored 1 goal which ended in a 1–1 draw against Arsenal in a second match at his Penang home ground, City Stadium.

In 2011, he was honoured by Ex-State & Ex-National Footballers Association of Malaysia to appreciate his contribution to the country as a football player.

On 17 February 2022, IFFHS selected him on their list of Men’s All Time Malaysia Dream Team.

Personal life
His older brother Ali Bakar was also a football player, also playing for Penang and Malaysia.

Honours
Penang
 Malaysia Cup: 1974
 Aga Khan Gold Cup: 1976
 Malaysia League: 1982

PPC
Malaysia FAM Cup: 1981, 1983

Malaysia
 Bronze medal Asian Games: 1974
 Gold Medal SEA Games: 1977, 1979
 Merdeka Cup: 1976
 King's Cup: 1977

References

External links
Piala FAM PPC FC - Harimau Malaya FB (In Malay)
 Tak Lek Dek Panas - Isa Bakar FB (In Malay)
Players with 30 or More Goals - RSSSF

1952 births
2010 deaths
Malaysian footballers
Malaysia international footballers
1976 AFC Asian Cup players
People from Penang
Penang F.C. players
Association football forwards
Asian Games bronze medalists for Malaysia
Asian Games medalists in football
Southeast Asian Games gold medalists for Malaysia
Southeast Asian Games medalists in football
Medalists at the 1974 Asian Games
Competitors at the 1977 Southeast Asian Games
Footballers at the 1974 Asian Games